WBTV-LP (99.3 FM) is a radio station licensed to serve the community of Burlington, Vermont. The station is owned by Vermont Community Access Media (VCAM). It airs a variety radio format.

The station was assigned the WBTV-LP call letters by the Federal Communications Commission on December 2, 2014. It signed on September 8, 2017, though its programming had already been available through an Internet radio feed for nearly a year.

References

External links
 Official Website
 

BTV-LP
BTV-LP
Radio stations established in 2017
2017 establishments in Vermont
Variety radio stations in the United States